Cara o cruz, is an American telenovela created and produced by Telemundo and Argos Comunicación in 2001.

Cast 

 José Ángel Llamas - Ismael Serrano
 Ana de la Reguera - Mariana Medina / Aída
 José María Yaspik - Armando Pescador
 Plutarco Haza - Martín Alcántara
 Fabián Corres - Aurelio Salazar
 Patricia Pereyra - Teresa Alcántara
 Itari Martha - Lourdes Alcántara
 Julieta Egurrola - Matilde Sosa de Alcántara
 Enrique Singer - Leonardo Medina
 Juan Pablo Abitia - Eduardo Medina
 Gabriela Roel - Claudette
 Jorge Lavat - Melchor Hidalgo
 Patricio Castillo - Fidelio
 Luisa Huertas - Julia
 Alpha Acosta - Cony
 Isabel Herrera - Noemi
 Octavio Castro - Yeyo
 Roger Nevares - Dr. Efrain Guzmán
 Fabián Peña - Lic. Emilio Carranza
 Verónica Toussaint - Alejandra
 Joaquín Cosío
 Alberta Guerra
 Martha Higareda - Rosario
 Dora Montera
 Sandra Quiroz
 Javier Ríos
 Fernando Sarfatti
 Georgina Tabera

External links 
 

Telemundo telenovelas
1990 telenovelas
2001 American television series debuts
2001 American television series endings